Propapias is a genus of skipper butterflies in the family Hesperiidae. It has one species Propapias sipariana.

References
Natural History Museum Lepidoptera genus database

Hesperiinae
Monotypic butterfly genera
Hesperiidae genera